Kwara State, is a state in Western Nigeria, bordered to the east by Kogi State, to the north by Niger state, and to the south by Ekiti, Osun, and Oyo states, while its western border makes up part of the international border with Benin Republic. Its capital is the city of Ilorin and the state has 16 local government areas.

Of the 36 states of Nigeria, Kwara is the ninth largest in area, but the sixth least populous, with an estimated population of about 3.2 million as at 2016. Geographically, Kwara state is split between the West Sudanian savanna in the west, and the Guinean forest–savanna mosaic ecoregion in the rest of the state. Important geographic features of the state include rivers, with the Niger flowing along the northern border into Lake Jeba, before continuing as the border, while the Awun, Asa, Aluko, and Oyun rivers flow through the interior. In the far northwest of the state is the Borgu section of the Kainji National Park, a large national park that contains populations of grey heron, kob, hippopotamus, African bush elephant, olive baboon, and roan antelope, along with some of the last remaining West African lions on Earth. In the far southwest, a small part of the Old Oyo National Park contains crowned eagle, martial eagle, African buffalo, oribi, and patas monkey populations.

Kwara state has been inhabited for years by various ethnic groups, primarily the majority Yoruba people that live throughout the state, but there are sizeable minorities of Nupe people in the northeast, Bariba (Baatonu) and Busa (Bokobaru) peoples in the west, and a small Fulani population in Ilorin, moving through the state as nomadic herders.

In the pre-colonial period, majority of the area that is now Kwara state was part of the Oyo Empire, with part of the western portions in the Borgu Kingdoms peopled by the Bariba, Boko and Bissa people, and Nupe Kingdom (1531-1835). In the mid 1800s, the Fulani jihad annexed some part of what is now the state of Kwara and placed the area under the Gwandu sphere of the Sokoto Caliphate. In the 1890s and 1900s, British expeditions occupied the area and incorporated it into the Northern Nigeria Protectorate. The Northern Nigeria later merged into British Nigeria in 1914, before becoming independent as Nigeria in 1960. Originally, the modern-day Kwara state was a part of the post-independence Northern Region until 1967, when the region was split and the area became the West Central State. In 1976, the state was renamed Kwara state and the name remained until the 1990s, when its southeast was split off to form a part of Kogi state and its far northwest Borgu division was annexed into the Borgu division of Niger state.

Economically, Kwara state is largely based around agriculture, mainly of coffee, cotton, groundnut, cocoa, oil palm, and kola nut crops. Other key industries are services, especially in the city of Ilorin, and the livestock herding and ranching of cattle, goats, and sheep. Kwara state has the joint-twentieth highest Human Development Index in the country and numerous institutions of tertiary education.

History 
Kwara state was created on 27 May 1967, when the Federal Military Government of General Yakubu Gowon broke the four regions that then constituted the Federation of Nigeria into 12 states. At its creation, the state was made up of the former Ilorin and Kabba provinces of the then Northern Region and was initially named the West Central State but later changed to "Kwara", a local name for the River Niger, in the Hausa language.

Kwara state has since 1976 reduced considerably in size as a result of further state creation exercises in Nigeria. On 13 February 1976, the Idah/Dekina part of the state was carved out and merged with a part of the then Benue/Plateau state to form Benue state.

On 27 August 1991, five Local Government areas, namely Oyi, Yagba, Okene, Okehi and Kogi were also excised to form part of the new Kogi state, while a sixth, Borgu Local Government Area, was merged with Niger state. The major populated local governments are Ilorin and Offa.

Kwara state has numerous mineral resources such as tourmaline, tantalite, and many mineral deposits in the northern part. Cocoa and Kolanut in the Southern parts Oke - Ero, Ekiti and Isin LGA.

Climate 
The climate of the Kwara state capital, Ilorin, is tropically wet and dry and it has an annual rainfall, which ranges between 990.3 mm to 1318mm mean value. The city has a varying temperature of 330C to 370C, with the third month of the year, March, being the hottest. The minimum and maximum temperature, as well as the relative humidity of the state capital, are on the rise between years 1978 and 2017. The wind that blows in this region constitutes both South-East and North-East continental wind.

Population
As at 2006, the population of Kwarans was 2.37 million, based on the Nigerian 2006 Census. This population size constitutes about 1.69% of the nation's total population having relied upon immigration for population growth and socioeconomic development. The principal ethnic groups are Yoruba, Nupe, Fulani and Baruba.

Residents of the state are sometimes referred to as Kwarans.

Languages
Languages of Kwara State listed by LGA:

Other languages spoken in Kwara State include Busa, Boko, and Sorko.

Local Government Areas 

Kwara State consists of sixteen Local Government Areas. They are:

 Asa
 Baruten
 Edu
 Ekiti
 Ifelodun
 Ilorin East
 Ilorin South
 Ilorin West
 Irepodun
 Isin
 Kaiama
 Moro
 Offa
 Oke Ero
 Oyun
 Pategi

Governor of  Kwara State
The current governor of Kwara State is Governor Abdulrazaq Abdulrahman, who emerged victorious in the March 9, 2019's governorship election, with the political party APC. AbdulRahman AbdulRazak was sworn in on May 29, 2019, making him the 4th democratic governor of Kwara state and the 20th governor of Kwara state overall.Kayode Alabi is serving as the deputy governor of Kwara state under AbdulRahman's administration.

Education 

Kwara state has a federal university, the University of Ilorin, a state university, Kwara State University and seven other privately owned Universities: Al-Hikmah University, Landmark University, Summit University, Crown Hill University, Thomas Adewumi University, Ahman Pategi University and University of Offa. Kwara state also has five approved polytechnics; a federal polytechnics, Federal Polytechnic Offa, a state owned polytechnics, Kwara State Polytechnic and three privately owned: The Polytechnic Igbo Owu, Lens Polytechnic and Graceland Polytechnic. Of the fifteen Colleges of Education in Kwara state, eleven are owned by private establishments: College of Education Ilemona, Muhyideen College of Education, Kinsey College of Education, Ilorin, Kwara State, Moje College of Education, Erin-Ile, Imam Hamzat College of Education, ECWA College of Education, College of Education Offa, Nana Aisha College of Education, Adesina College of Education and Pan African College of Education. Four colleges of education  in Kwara state are funded by the star government: Kwara State College of Education Ilorin, College of Education Oro, Kwara State College of Education (Technical) Lafiagi and one federal government's institution offering NCE, the Nigeria Army School of Education. There is also a navy school, Nigerian Navy School of Health Science, Irra Road, Offa and an aviation college, International Aviation College, Ilorin.

Healthcares 
Kwara State has many hospitals and medical health cares, these include:

 General Hospital Illorin
 University of Illorin Teaching Hospital
 Life Line Hospital
 Lifefount Hospital
 Balm Hospital
 Sadiku Hospital
 kwara State Civil Service Hospital
 Sobi Specialist Hospital
 Anchormed Hospital
 Mimtaz Hospital
 Asa Dam Hospital

Tourism 

Important tourist attractions in Kwara state include Esie Museum, Owu waterfalls, one of the highest and most spectacular waterfalls in west Africa. Imoleboja Rock Shelter, Ogunjokoro, Kainji Lake National Parks, now in Niger state and Agbonna Hill—Awon Mass Wedding in Shao. There is also Sobi Hill amongst other, which is the largest landform in Ilorin, the state capital. A huge natural reserve also divides the state into East and West. Ero Omola waterfall is also tourist attractions

Transport 

The Nigerian Railway Corporation extends services from Lagos through the state to the northern part of the country. Ilorin Airport is a major center for both domestic and international flights and has now been built up into a hub for transportation of cargoes.

Economy 
Agriculture is the main source of the state's economy and the principal cash crops are: cotton, cocoa, coffee, Kolanut, tobacco, beniseed and palm produce. Kwara state is home to Shonga Farms, a product of the Back-to-Farm project of one of the past administrators of the state, Dr. Abubakar Bukola Saraki. Shonga Farms is  made up of 13 commercial farmers. Mineral resources in the state are Petroleum, Gold, limestone, marble, feldspar, clay, kaolin, quartz and granite rocks.

Infrastructure

Hygiene and Sanitation

The government of Nigeria is increasingly aware of problems emanating from poor environmental sanitation, and Kwara state is working on improving its environment and sanitation. On September 22, 2020, Kwara state governor officially commenced the 'Clean Kwara' Campaign to end open defecation and promote good hygiene in the state.  The state government is working to fix all the roads and waterways to ensure free water flow, putting in efforts to ensure water sanitation, building toilets and making clean water accessible. This is also to promote Sustainable Development Goals 3 & 6 (general access to safe and affordable drinking water and access to adequate and equitable sanitation, hygiene for all, and end open defecation by 2030)

Sports 
Sporting activities are managed by the State Sports Council. The importance attached to sports led to the construction of a stadium, named—Kwara State Stadium Complex. The facilities available at the stadium complex are mainbowl, indoor sports hall, hostel, recreational press center as well as an Olympic size swimming pool. The state is actively represented both in football and basketball. The state is the home to the Kwara United Football Club, ABS FC and Kwara Falcons Basketball Club.

Notable people 

AbdulRahman AbdulRazaq, politician 
Bukola Saraki, politician
David Abioye, cleric
Cornelius Adebayo, politician
Femi Adebayo, actor and film producer
Tunde Adebimpe, musician
Kemi Adesoye, screenwriter
Abdulfatah Ahmed, banker and politician
Simon Ajibola, politician 
Mustapha Akanbi, lawyer
Sheik Adam Abdullah Al-Ilory, Islamic scholar
Sarah Alade, former CBN governor
Lola Ashiru, architect and politician
Adamu Atta, politician
Kunle Afolayan, actor, film director and producer
Ayeloyun, musician
Joseph Ayo Babalola, cleric
David Bamigboye, soldier
Theophilus Bamigboye, soldier and politician
Salihu Modibbo Alfa Belgore, jurist and former Chief Justice of Nigeria
Oga Bello, actor and producer (real name Adebayo Salami)
Ibrahim Gambari, diplomat
Yusuf Gobir, administrator
Ola Ibrahim, naval officer
Rafiu Adebayo Ibrahim, politician
Tunde Idiagbon, soldier
Ahmed Mohammed Inuwa, politician 
Joana Nnazua Kolo, Commissioner for Youth and Sports Development
Farooq Kperogi, journalist
Mohammed Shaaba Lafiagi, politician
Lágbájá, musician
Salaudeen Latinwo, soldier
Mohammed Lawal, naval officer
Lai Mohammed, lawyer and politician
Ibrahim Yahaya Oloriegbe, politician
Abdulkadir Orire, first Grand Khadi of the Kwara State Sharia Court of Appeal
David Oyedepo, cleric
Wasiu Alabi Pasuma, musician
Gbemisola Ruqayyah Saraki, politician
Olusola Saraki, politician
 Toyin Saraki, healthcare philanthropist
Abdulfatai Yahaya Seriki, politician
AbdulRazzaq Ibrahim Salman, cleric
Bola Shagaya, businessman
Tony Tetuila, musician
Rashidi Yekini, soccer player
Abimbola Abolarinwa, urologist

See also 
Kwara State Executive Council

References

 
States of Nigeria
States in Yorubaland
States and territories established in 1967